Sambhaji Shiwaji Shinde (born on 2 August 1960) is a retired Indian Judge who served as Judge of Bombay High Court and then transferred to Rajasthan High Court as Chief justice.

Career
He was born on 2 August 1960. He completed L.L.B. from Dr. Babasaheb Ambedkar Marathwada University and L.L.M. from Warwick University, United Kingdom. On 9 April 1987 he was enrolled as an Advocate and started practice in the year 1989. He was elevated as an Additional Judge of Bombay High Court on 11 March 2008 and made Permanent Judge on 13 March 2010. He was elevated as Chief Justice of Rajasthan High Court on 21 June 2022. He was retired on 1 August 2022.

References

Indian judges
1960 births
Living people